Max Bennett (November 4, 1912 – January 5, 1972) was a Canadian professional ice hockey right winger who played in one National Hockey League game for the Montreal Canadiens during the 1935–36 NHL season.

See also
List of players who played only one game in the NHL

External links

1912 births
1972 deaths
Buffalo Bisons (AHL) players
Canadian ice hockey right wingers
Ice hockey people from Ontario
Montreal Canadiens players
People from Cobalt, Ontario
Pittsburgh Hornets players
Washington Lions players